The Teton Range is a mountain range of the Rocky Mountains in North America. It is south of Yellowstone National Park, and most of the east side of the range is within Grand Teton National Park.

One theory says the early French voyageurs named the range  ("the three nipples") after the breast-like shapes of its peaks. Another theory says the range is named for the Teton Sioux (from Thítȟuŋwaŋ), also known as the Lakota people. It is likely that the local Shoshone people once called the whole range , meaning "many pinnacles".

The principal summits of the central massif, sometimes referred to as the Cathedral Group, are Grand Teton, Mount Owen, Teewinot, Middle Teton and South Teton. Other peaks in the range include Mount Moran, Mount Wister, Buck Mountain and Static Peak.

Geology

Between six and nine million years ago, stretching and thinning of the Earth's crust caused movement along the Teton fault. The west block along the fault line rose to form the Teton Range, creating the youngest mountain range in the Rocky Mountains. The fault's east block fell to form the valley called Jackson Hole. The geological processes that led to the current composition of the oldest rocks in the Teton range began about 2.5 billion years ago. At that time, sand and volcanic debris settled into an ancient ocean. Additional sediment was deposited for millions of years and eventually heat and pressure metamorphosed the sediment into gneiss. 

Subsequently, magma was forced up through the cracks in the gneiss to form granite, anywhere from inches to hundreds of feet thick. Other intrusive igneous rocks are noticeable as the black dikes of diabase, visible on the southwest face of Mount Moran and on the Grand Teton. Starting during the Cambrian period, deep deposits of sedimentary rock were deposited in shallow seas over the metamorphic basement rocks. Erosion and uplift have exposed the metamorphic and intrusive igneous rocks now visible on the east slope of the range and in the Cathedral Group and the Paleozoic and Cenozoic sedimentary rocks on the west slope. As recently as 2.1 million years ago the Huckleberry Ridge Tuff was deposited along the west slope of the north part of the range.

Unlike most mountain ranges, the east side of the Teton Range lacks significant foothills or lower peaks which might obscure the view. This is due to the presence of the Teton Fault at the base of the east slope as well as the range being too young to have eroded into soft hills. The Snake River flows southward through the valley before turning to the west and entering Idaho.

As a filming location
The Tetons and Jackson Hole have been the setting for a number of films, including John Wayne's film acting debut in The Big Trail in 1930 and the western film classic Shane in 1953. Mount Moran and the surrounding mountains were used as a backdrop for the lake/swamp setting in the original television series Land of the Lost. In addition, this mountain range is shown on the cover of rapper Kanye West's eighth studio album Ye.

See also
Breast-shaped hill
Geology of the Grand Teton area
List of mountain ranges in Wyoming

Notes

External links

National Park Service Grand Teton Park site
A description of the Grand Teton Grand Traverse

Ranges of the Rocky Mountains
Mountain ranges of Wyoming
Landforms of Grand Teton National Park
Greater Yellowstone Ecosystem
Landforms of Teton County, Wyoming